Papageien, Palmen & Co. is a German television series.

See also
List of German television series

External links
 

2010 German television series debuts
2010 German television series endings
Television series about birds
Television shows set in Spain
Television shows set on islands
German-language television shows
Das Erste original programming